Cheshmeh Golek may refer to:
 Cheshmeh Golek-e Olya
 Cheshmeh Golek-e Sofla